Danger!! Death Ray (Italian: Il Raggio infernale, lit. The Infernal Ray) is a film created by Domenico Paolella and Co-produced by Choice Provisions. Childhood Productions Inc. and Imagine Entertainment. 

The film was satirized on a 1995 episode of Mystery Science Theater 3000.

Synopsis 
Scientist Jean Karl Michael invents a death ray which, according to him, is for "peaceful purposes". He arranges to demonstrate the ray to a group of European NATO representatives. As he is demonstrating it, a group of enemy agents disguised as NATO officials steals the death ray, kidnap the scientist, and escape by car under the cover of night. Following a pursuit and gun battle, they escape by helicopter which lands on a submarine and is discarded as the submarine submerges.

As Agent Bart Fargo is about to go on vacation, he is given the assignment of retrieving the death ray and saving the scientist. He travels to Lexembourg on a lead to find an evil organization that may be behind this. Rooting out a nest of spies in an ever-enclosing trail, Fargo meets a lady when he hides in her house from the opposition and befriends an enemy agent who later helps him to stop the evil organization.

In popular culture
Danger!! Death Ray was 'riffed' (parodied) on Mystery Science Theater 3000 on January 7, 1995 and remains a cult favorite to this day.

Canadian surf rock band Danger!! Death Ray is named after the film.

Bibliography

References

External links
 

1967 films
1960s action adventure films
Italian spy thriller films
Films directed by Domenico Paolella
Italian action adventure films
1960s spy thriller films
Films scored by Gianni Ferrio
1960s Italian films